Huff Township is one of nine townships in Spencer County, Indiana. As of the 2010 census, its population was 1,156 and it contained 496 housing units.

History
Huff Township was organized in 1837, and named for Aquilla Huff.

Geography

Unincorporated towns
Evanston
Maxville
New Boston
Schley

References

External links
 Indiana Township Association
 United Township Association of Indiana

Townships in Spencer County, Indiana
Townships in Indiana